Toreulia placita is a species of moth of the family Tortricidae. It is found in Napo Province, Ecuador.

The wingspan is 17-18.5 mm.  The ground colour of the forewings is pale cinnamon suffused with white near a white line and in the terminal part. There is brownish strigulation (fine streaks), as well as rusty-brown markings. The hindwings are brownish white, but whitish basally and strigulated with greyish brown.

Etymology
The species name refers to the colouration of the species and is derived from Latin placita (meaning nice).

References

Moths described in 2007
Euliini